The Ivchenko Progress D-36 (also known as Lotarev D-36) is a three-shaft high bypass ratio turbofan currently produced by the Ukrainian Motor Sich company.

Design and development
The engine was developed for the Yak-42, An-72 and An-74 aircraft and was very advanced when it was first introduced in the 1970s. The engine was designed by Vladimir Lotarev. The first test runs began in 1971, first flight tests followed in 1974, serial production began in 1977.

The engine has a single-stage fan with 29 titanium blades and a Kevlar outer shell, which is driven by a three-stage turbine. The six-stage low pressure compressor with titanium blades is driven by a single-stage non-cooled low pressure turbine. The seven-stage high-pressure compressor with steel blades is driven by a steel bladed high-pressure turbine. 

Since the tradition in the Soviet era was to gradually and continuously improve engines in serviceability, engines went from Series 1 to 3A (depending on the application). The Series 1 (used on Yak-42D) did not feature any reverse thrust system however, series 1A to 3A were fitted with bucket-type thrust reversers (used on An-72/An-74). The most recent upgrade (after the Soviet breakup) is Series 4A which has been in manufacture since 2002. Improvements included updated curved titanium blades and a built-in reverse thrust device. More advanced blade design along with proprietary wear-resistant and heat-protective coatings have resulted in improved specific fuel consumption (kg/h/kgf) dropping from 0.65 to 0.63. Specified service life has also improved exponentially to 40,000 hours. The current application for Series 4A is on An-74TK-300.

Specifications

See also

References

Ivchenko-Progress aircraft engines
High-bypass turbofan engines
1970s turbofan engines
Three-spool turbofan engines